Alejandro González was the defending champion, but chose to compete at the 2014 Brasil Open.

Víctor Estrella Burgos won the title, defeating Andrea Collarini in the final, 6–3, 6–4.

Seeds

Draw

Finals

Top half

Bottom half

References
 Main Draw
 Qualifying Draw

Challenger ATP de Salinas Diario Expreso - Singles
2014 Singles